Rinjish is an Indian first name. it is similar to Urdu word Renjish. this name is rarely used in southern India. 'Rin' depicts the brightness and 'Jish' as a common suffix used in those areas.

Indian masculine given names

he:חריש